NGC 874 is a spiral galaxy located in the Cetus constellation. It is estimated to be 572 million light-years away from the Milky Way galaxy and has a diameter of approximately 80,000 light-years. NGC 874 was discovered in 1886 by Frank Muller.

References 

Cetus (constellation)
874
Spiral galaxies
008663